Plinthaster is a genus of echinoderms belonging to the family Goniasteridae.

The genus has almost cosmopolitan distribution.

Species:

Plinthaster ceramoidea 
Plinthaster dentatus 
Plinthaster doederleini 
Plinthaster lenaigae 
Plinthaster untiedtae

References

Goniasteridae
Asteroidea genera